Lund Municipality is a municipality in Scania County, southern Sweden. Its seat is the city of Lund.

As most municipalities in Sweden, the territory of municipality consists of many former local government units, united in a series of amalgamations. The number of original entities (as of 1863) is 22. At the time of the nationwide municipal reform of 1952 the number had been reduced to six. In 1967 the rural municipality Torn (itself created in 1952) was added to Lund. The City of Lund was made a unitary municipality in 1971 and amalgamated with Dalby, Genarp, Södra Sandby and Veberöd in 1974 completing the process. Since 2016, the municipality is subdivided into 16 districts for the purposes of population and land registration.

Dalby Söderskog, one of Sweden's national parks, is located within the municipality near Dalby. Municipal bird of Lund is Eurasian penduline tit.

Localities

There are nine urban areas in Lund Municipality:

Municipal council 
In the 2018 municipal election, no block was able to gain control of the executive, a five-party minority coalition consisting of the four Alliance parties and local party FörNyaLund was formed as a result. Philip Sandberg of the Liberals heads the executive. The election results are presented in the table below. The turnout was 86.37%.

International relations

Twin towns — sister cities

The municipality is twinned with the following local government areas:

References

External links 

 Lund Municipality - Official site

 
Municipalities of Skåne County